Welle Ossou (born 11 March 1991) is Senegalese professional football player, with Italian citizenship, currently playing for Casalgrandese.

Career
He made his Serie A debut for Livorno on 22 June 2021, in a game against Parma when he came on as a substitute in the 22nd minute for Fabio Galante. On 12 September he was transferred to Rosignano.

References

External links
 

1991 births
Living people
Italian footballers
Senegalese emigrants to Italy
Italian sportspeople of African descent
Senegalese footballers
Serie A players
U.S. Livorno 1915 players
Association football defenders